Akhtarabad (also Romanized as Akhtarābād; also known as Z̧olmābād) is a village in Akhtarabad Rural District of Safadasht District of Malard County, Tehran province, Iran. At the 2006 National Census, its population was 498 in 134 households, when it was in the former Malard District of Shahriar County. The following census in 2011 counted 561 people in 129 households, by which time the district had been separated from the county and Malard County established. The latest census in 2016 showed a population of 430 people in 135 households; it was the largest village in its rural district.

References 

Malard County

Populated places in Tehran Province

Populated places in Malard County